Robert Cole (by 1478–1536/1550), was an English politician.

He was a Member (MP) of the Parliament of England for Gloucester in 1512.

References

15th-century births
16th-century deaths
English MPs 1512–1514
Members of the Parliament of England (pre-1707) for Gloucester